The initials PCG are used for:

Organizations
Pacific Corporate Group, investment company in California, USA
Pacific Gas and Electric Company (stock symbol)
Pentecostal Church of God
People's Consultative Group, a group mediating disputes between India and the United Liberation Front of Assam
Philadelphia Church of God
Philippine Coast Guard
Police Coast Guard of the Singapore Police Force
Popular Combatants Group, an insurgent group in Ecuador
Positive Montenegro, a former Montenegrin political party
Professional Contractors Group of UK freelance workers

Science and technology
Penicillin G, an antibiotic used to treat a number of bacterial infections
Permuted congruential generator, a pseudo-random number generation algorithm
Phonocardiogram, a recording of heart sounds
Polycomb-group proteins, a group of regulatory proteins which remodel chromatin to silence other genes
Preconditioned conjugate gradient method, an algorithm for the numerical solution of particular systems of linear equations
Procedural content generation (or generator), a method of producing a constrained artifact whose attributes are precisely unknown (and essentially random) but within desirable ranges
Programming/Code Golf, a board on Stack Exchange dedicated to code golf

Other uses
Parent company guarantee, a contract provision regarding subsidiary contractors
Plan Comptable Général, generally accepted accounting principles in France